East Highland Park is a census-designated place (CDP) in Henrico County, Virginia, in the United States. The population was 15,131 at the 2020 census.

Geography
East Highland Park is located at  (37.570945, −77.396655).

Demographics

2020 census

Note: the US Census treats Hispanic/Latino as an ethnic category. This table excludes Latinos from the racial categories and assigns them to a separate category. Hispanics/Latinos can be of any race.

2000 Census
As of the census of 2000, there were 12,488 people, 4,960 households, and 3,313 families residing in the CDP. The population density was 1,393.1 people per square mile (538.1/km2). There were 5,226 housing units at an average density of 583.0/sq mi (225.2/km2). The racial makeup of the CDP was 18.47% White, 79.36% African American, 0.29% Native American, 0.39% Asian, 0.01% Pacific Islander, 0.34% from other races, and 1.15% from two or more races. Hispanic or Latino of any race were 1.00% of the population.

There were 4,960 households, out of which 29.7% had children under the age of 18 living with them, 38.9% were married couples living together, 23.3% had a female householder with no husband present, and 33.2% were non-families. 28.4% of all households were made up of individuals, and 7.3% had someone living alone who was 65 years of age or older. The average household size was 2.48 and the average family size was 3.02.

In the CDP, the population was spread out, with 25.2% under the age of 18, 7.7% from 18 to 24, 29.6% from 25 to 44, 25.2% from 45 to 64, and 12.4% who were 65 years of age or older. The median age was 37 years. For every 100 females, there were 84.6 males. For every 100 females age 18 and over, there were 79.1 males.

The median income for a household in the CDP was $36,328, and the median income for a family was $43,781. Males had a median income of $31,504 versus $25,500 for females. The per capita income for the CDP was $17,251. About 6.9% of families and 9.5% of the population were below the poverty line, including 12.0% of those under age 18 and 9.2% of those age 65 or over.

References

Census-designated places in Henrico County, Virginia
Census-designated places in Virginia